A polyknight is a plane geometric figure formed by selecting cells in a square lattice that could represent the path of a chess knight in which doubling back is allowed. It is a polyform with square cells which are not necessarily connected, comparable to the polyking. Alternatively, it can be interpreted as a connected subset of the vertices of a knight's graph, a graph formed by connecting pairs of lattice squares that are a knight's move apart.

Enumeration of polyknights

Free, one-sided, and fixed polyknights 
Three common ways of distinguishing polyominoes for enumeration can also be extended to polyknights:
free polyknights are distinct when none is a rigid transformation (translation, rotation, reflection or glide reflection) of another (pieces that can be picked up and flipped over).
one-sided polyknights are distinct when none is a translation or rotation of another (pieces that cannot be flipped over).
fixed polyknights are distinct when none is a translation of another (pieces that can be neither flipped nor rotated).

The following table shows the numbers of polyknights of various types with n cells.

Notes

Polyforms
Recreational mathematics